Church on the Water also known as Chapel on the Water is a privately owned wedding chapel in Tomamu, Shimukappu on the island of Hokkaido in Japan. The chapel faces a large reflecting pool visible through a large floor-to-ceiling window in the Japanese architectural tradition of shakkei.

The building is a notable project of Japanese modernist architect Tadao Ando who designed the structure in 1985.

Gallery

References 

Tadao Ando buildings
Religious buildings and structures in Hokkaido
Churches completed in 1988